The Southern Ohio Conference (S.O.C.) is an athletic conference in Ohio.  The conference is also a member of the Ohio High School Athletic Association, the governing body of Ohio athletics.  There are currently seventeen member schools in the conference.  The S.O.C. includes teams from four different Ohio counties - Jackson County (Oak Hill High School), Lawrence County (St. Joe High School and Symmes Valley High School), Pike County (Waverly High School, Eastern High School, and Western High School), and Scioto County (Clay High School, Green High School, Glenwood High School, Sciotoville Community School, Valley High School, Northwest High School, Minford High School, Portsmouth West High School, Notre Dame High School, South Webster High School, and Wheelersburg High School).  The conference recognizes: baseball, boys' and girls' basketball, boys' and girls' cross country, football, boys' and girls' soccer, fast pitch softball, boys' and girls' swimming, boys' and girls' tennis, boys' and girls' track and field athletics, and girls' volleyball.

It is listed as part of the Ohio High School Athletic Conferences.

Conference Information

SOC Division I: Clay, East (Sciotoville), Glenwood/New Boston, Green, Notre Dame, Symmes Valley, Western (Pike), Ironton St. Joseph

SOC Division II: Minford, Northwest (D-I football), Oak Hill, Portsmouth West, South Webster (D-I golf & boys soccer), Valley (D-I boys soccer), Waverly, Eastern (Pike, D-I football) & Wheelersburg

The league president changes each year based on an alphabetical rotating basis with the principal of member schools.  The current league secretary (voted on each year by the league) is Dave Stamm.

Southern Ohio Conference Member Schools

S.O.C. Division I (Smaller Schools)
 Portsmouth Clay Panthers4 (1979–present)
 New Boston Glenwood Tigers (1946–present)
 Franklin Furnace Green Bobcats4 (1979–present)
 Portsmouth Notre Dame Titans (Portsmouth Central Catholic until 1984, 1954–present)
 Sciotoville Community EastTartans (formerly Portsmouth East, 1946–present)
 Willow Wood Symmes Valley Vikings (1991–present)
 Latham Western Indians (2002–present)
Ironton St.Joseph Central Flyers (2019–present)

S.O.C. Division II (Larger Schools)
 Minford Falcons2 (1947–58, to Scioto County League, 1959–present)
 McDermott Northwest Mohawks2 (1960–present)  *plays in smaller division for football
 Oak Hill Oaks (1991–present)   *played in smaller division for football until 2019
 West Portsmouth Portsmouth West Senators (Washington Twp. until 1950, 1946–present)
 South Webster Jeeps4 (1979–present)    *plays in smaller division for golf and boys soccer until 2019
 Lucasville Valley Indians2 (1958–present)    *plays in smaller division for boys soccer
 Waverly Tigers1 (1946–70, to Southeastern Ohio Athletic League, 1983–present)
 Wheelersburg Pirates2, 3 (1950–present)
 Beaver Eastern Eagles4 (1981–present)

 Concurrent with Pike County League 1946-64.
 Concurrent with SCL from entry into SOC until 1979.
 Concurrent with Ohio Valley Conference 1954-57.
 Concurrent with southeastern Tri-County League from entry into SOC until 1985

Former Members
 Portsmouth Holy Redeemer Wildcats (1946–54, consolidated into Portsmouth Central Catholic)
 Portsmouth St. Mary's Titans (1946–54, consolidated into Portsmouth Central Catholic)
 Chesapeake Panthers (1948–1954, to Ohio Valley Conference)
 South Point Pointers1 (1948–51, to Lawrence County)
 Coal Grove Dawson-Bryant Hornets1 (1950–1952, to Lawrence County)
 Piketon Redstreaks (1958–62, to Scioto Valley League)
 Ironton St. Joseph Central Flyers (1982–89)

 Concurrent with Lawrence County League for the duration of SOC membership.

Ohio High School Athletic Association state championships and appearances
 Portsmouth Clay
Boys' Basketball
OHSAA Final Four Appearance
1969 (Arcanum def. Clay 76-61)
Girls' Basketball
OHSAA Final Four Appearance
1980
Boys' Golf
OHSAA Division III State Championship Appearances
2004, 2005, 2006
Girls' Softball
OHSAA State Championships
1980 - (d. Archbold 18-6 & d. New Madison Tri-Village 12-3 to finish season at 25-0)
1981 - (d. Jeromesville Hillsdale 7-2 & d. Beverly Fort Frye 21-0 to finish season at 29-0)
1983 - (d. Pioneer North Central 8-7 & d. Mineral Ridge 6-2 to finish season at 24-1)
OHSAA State Runner-up
1979 - (d. New Madison Tri-Village 11-2 & lost to Jeromesville Hillsdale 1-4 to finish the season at 19-1)
1988 - (d. Sycamore Mohawk 10-0 & lost to Strasburg-Franklin 0-14 to finish the season at 27-3)
OHSAA Final Four Appearances (besides the Championships and Second Place Finishes)
1978 - (lost to Jeromesville Hillsdale 5-0)
1984 - (lost to Arcanum 10-4)
1986 - (lost to Archbold 5-4)
2007 - (lost to Triad 13-3 to finish season at 22-5)
OHSAA Softball Tournament Records
Most Runs (Game, One Team) - Portsmouth Clay (Division III) 21 v. Beverly Fort Frye, 1981
Most Hits (Game) - Portsmouth Clay (Division III) 19 v. Archbold, 1980
Most Hits (Game) - North Lewisburg Triad (Division IV) 13 v. Portsmouth Clay, 2007
Most Hits (Game, Both Teams) - Portsmouth Clay (Division III) 28 v. Archbold, 1980
Teresa Ruby - played in first four OHSAA state softball tournaments (1978-1981), coach (2007)

 East (Sciotoville Community)
Boys' Baseball - 
OHSAA State Championship
1973 (East def. Adena Buckeye West 5-3)

 Eastern Pike
Boys' Golf
OHSAA Division III State Championship Appearance
2006

 Franklin Furnace Green
Boys' Basketball
OHSAA Final Four Appearance
1939

Minford
Girls' Softball
OHSAA Runner-up
1997 - (d. LaGrange Keystone 1-0 & lost to Tallmadge 7-0 to finish season at 27-4)
OHSAA Final Four Appearances (besides the Second Place Finish)
1994 - (lost to LaGrange Keystone 2-0)
1996 - (lost to Alliance Marlington 4-0)

 New Boston
Boys' Basketball
OHSAA Final Four Appearances
1938
1960 - (Salem Local d. New Boston 67-59)
2021  ( Columbus Grove d. New Boston 58-53)

 Notre Dame
Football - 1967 & 1970 Associated Press state championships

 Oak Hill
Girls' Basketball
OHSAA Runner-ups 
2004 - (Youngstown Ursuline d. Oak Hill 66-52)
2009 - (South Euclid Regina d. Oak Hill 63-48)
2011 - (Anna d. Oak Hill 50-32)
Boys' Basketball
OHSAA State Championship
2009 - ( d. Kalida 48-43 2OT)
 South Webster
Boys' Basketball
OHSAA State Championship
2006 - (d. Lockland 61-58 & d. Columbus Grove 83-65)
OHSAA Final Four Appearances
2004 - (Holgate d. South Webster 31-28)

Symmes Valley
Boys' Basketball (as Waterloo High School before consolidation, "Waterloo Wonders")
OHSAA State Championship
1934 - (d. Lowellville 43-32 & d. Mark Center 40-26)
1935 - (d. Fremont St. Joseph 48-21 & d. Oxford Stewart 25-22)
OHSAA Final Four Appearances (besides the Championships)
1941
Girls' Softball
OHSAA State Runner-up
2005 (d. Cortland Maplewood 3-2 & lost to Convoy Crestview 6-4 to finish season at 28-5)

 Lucasville Valley
Boys' Baseball
OHSAA State Championship
1975 (Valley def. Russia 5-0)
Girls' Softball
OHSAA Final Four Appearances
1993 - (lost to North Robinson Colonel Crawford 9-3)
1994 - (lost to Jeromesville Hillsdale 6-1)

 Waverly
Boys' Baseball
OHSAA State Championship
1954 (Waverly def. Sycamore 2-1)
Boys' Basketball
OHSAA Final Four Appearance
1970 (Dayton Chaminade d. Waverly 73-55)
1973 - Associated Press Class AA Boys' Basketball Poll Champion (17-1)

 Portsmouth West
Football
Division IV State Final Appearance
2002 (Kenton def. Portsmouth West 45-13)
Girls' Softball
OHSAA State Runner-up
1987 - (d. Marion Elgin 4-3 & lost to Akron Hoban 5-1 to finish season at 22-6)
1988 - (d. Newark Licking Valley 5-4 & lost to Tallmadge 16-2 to finish season at 28-1)
OHSAA Final Four Appearances (besides the Second Place Finishes)
1986 - (lost to Newark Licking Valley 11-1)
1989 - (lost to Springfield Northwestern 8-4)
1998 - (lost to Keystone LaGrange 2-1)
1999 - (lost to Keystone LaGrange 1-0)
2000 - (lost to Lima Bath 3-2)
2001 - (lost to Keystone LaGrange 3-0)
2002 - (lost to Springfield Kenton Ridge 4-0)
2003 - (lost to Convoy Crestview 5-0)

 Wheelersburg
Boys' Baseball
OHSAA State Championships
1996 - def. Middlefield Cardinal 4-1
2012 - def. Lima Central Catholic 1-0
2013 - def. Bloom-Carroll 5-4
Boys' Basketball
OHSAA State Runner-up
1984 - (d. Willard 70-64 & lost to Akron St. Vincent - St. Mary 75-71 to finish season at 23-5)
1995 - (d. Columbus Bishop Hartley 76-60 & lost to Orrville 79-50 to finish season at 23-4)
OHSAA Final Four Appearances
1982 - Youngstown Rayen d. Wheelersburg 61-45)
1989 - (Cincinnati North College Hill d. Wheelersburg 71-67 (2OT))
2006 - (Cleveland Cleveland Villa Angela-St. Joseph d. Wheelersburg 71-62)
2007 - (Cincinnati North College Hill d. Wheelersburg 69-66 (OT))
OHSAA State Basketball Tournament Records
Largest Margin of Victory - Championship Game (Division III) - Orrville 79 d. Wheelersburg 50 in 1995
Most Two-Point Field Goals - Championship Game - Orrville (35) v. Wheelersburg in 1995
Most Two-Point Field Goals, Both Teams - Championship Game - 53 (Orrville 35 & Wheelersburg 18) in 1995
Most Rebounds - Championship Game - Orrville (44) v. Wheelersburg in 1995
Football
 OHSAA State Championship
1989 (def. Warren John F. Kennedy 14-7)
2017 (def. Pemberville Eastwood 21-14OT)
Girls' Softball
 OHSAA State Runner-up
2004 (d. Archbold 2-1 & lost to Woodsfield Monroe Central 1-0 to finish season at 25-6) 
 OHSAA State Championship
2016 (d. Johnstown-Monroe, 1-0, within the state semifinals, and then d. South Range, 8-3, within the championship final. The Pirates finished the season 26-2.

Conference awards and championships
Conference Awards & Championships in each Sport

Notable coaches' and player awards
 Terri Boldman (Clay) - Clay Coaches' Hall of Fame, one of only two S.O.C. coaches to lead girls' basketball team to OHSAA Final Four (1980)
 Ed Cable (Northwest) - Recipient of the Ohio Sportsmanship, Ethics, & Integrity Softball Coaches' Award (2002)
 Odie Estep (Willow Wood Symmes Valley) - Ohio Softball Coaches' Hall of Fame (2007)
 Arch Justus (Clay, Minford & Valley) - Ohio Basketball Coaches' Hall of Fame, Clay Coaches' Hall of Fame, won 532 total basketball games
 David Leightenheimer (Clay) - Clay Coaches' Hall of Fame & OHSAA Officials' Hall of Fame
 Kinney Long (Clay) - Clay Coaches' Hall of Fame
 Ed Miller (Notre Dame & Wheelersburg) - Ohio Football Coaches' Hall of Fame (1996), won two Associated Press state titles with Notre Dame in 1967 and 1970 and a Division IV OHSAA title with Wheelersburg in 1989
 Teresa Ruby (Clay) - played in the first four OHSAA state softball Final Four tournaments (1978–1981), won two state softball championships (as a player) in 1980 & 1981 and finished second in 1979, played in the 1980 girls' basketball Final Four, led her softball team (as a coach) to the 2007 state Final Four, holds many Clay basketball records (including leading scorer), has her number (#14) retired by the school.  She also has a star on the Portsmouth Wall of Stars (2009).
 Carol Vice (Clay) - Clay Coaches' Hall of Fame, Ohio High School Fastpitch Softball Coaches Association Hall of Fame (2010); Star on Portsmouth's Wall of Stars, made it to the Final Four in softball 9 of 10 years as a coach, won three OHSAA state softball titles (1980, 81, & 83) while also finishing as runners-up twice (1979 & 1988), only softball coach from S.O.C. to win a softball title
 Norm Persin - Oak Hill Basketball - voted National Basketball Coach of The Year in 2009.

References

External links & gallery 
Member Schools &  Websites

 Sciotoville Community East
  Eastern Pike
  Green
 McDermott Northwest
 Willow Wood Symmes Valley
 Lucasville Valley
  Waverly
  Western Pike
 History of the Southern Ohio Conference

Ohio high school sports conferences